The Roar of Love is a 1980 concept album and fourth studio album by Christian band 2nd Chapter of Acts, that recounts the story of The Lion, the Witch and the Wardrobe, the first published book in The Chronicles of Narnia, a series by C. S. Lewis. According to band member Matthew Ward, all the vocals were cut in a bedroom of the house the trio lived in at the time. They converted their garage into a mixing room, knocked a hole in the bedroom wall and ran a microphone cord into it. The songs have a heavy use of synthesizers. It was reissued on the Live Oak label.

Track listing 

All songs were written by Annie Herring except "White Stag" (music by Matthew Ward and lyrics by Matthew Ward, Nellie Greisen and Annie Herring).

Note: On the later CD and iTunes releases, tracks 6 and 7 are combined into one simply titled "Christmas, Where Are You?", for a total of 13 tracks.

Source(s):

Personnel 

 2nd Chapter of Acts — vocals, vocal arrangements and crystal glasses
 Leland Sklar — bass
 David Kemper — drums
 Michael Omartian — keyboards, synthesizers and instrumental arrangements
 Phil Keaggy — guitar, guitar solos
 Jay Graydon — guitar
 Alex Cima — synthesizer programming
 Matthew Ward — whistle
 Joel Strasser — photography
 Larry McAdams — cover illustration and design

Source(s):

References 

Roar of Love
1980 albums
2nd Chapter of Acts albums
Music based on novels
Concept albums